Bevinhal  is a village in the southern state of Karnataka, India. It is located in the Gangawati taluk of Koppal district in Karnataka.

Demographics
As of 2001 India census, Bevinhal had a population of 5288 with 2649 males and 2639 females.

See also
 Koppal
 Districts of Karnataka

References

External links
 https://web.archive.org/web/20190810051205/https://koppal.nic.in/

Villages in Koppal district